Maria Grenfell (born 1969) is an Australian music teacher and composer of New Zealand origin.

Early life and education
Maria Grenfell was born in Petaling Jaya, Malaysia in 1969. She grew up and was educated in Christchurch, New Zealand, where she graduated from the University of Canterbury with a Master of Music degree. She subsequently went to the US, where she completed a Master of Arts at the Eastman School of Music in Rochester, New York, and a doctorate from the University of Southern California in Los Angeles, while also lecturing in music there. While in the USA she was taught by Stephen Hartke, Erica Muhl, James Hopkins, and Morten Lauridsen in Los Angeles, and Joseph Schwantner and Samuel Adler in Rochester, New York.

Work
Grenfell allows her work to be influenced by poetic, literary and visual sources but also by non-Western music and literature. Her music has been described as “expansive, effusive and energetic”, “magic”, “refreshingly groovy” and "brilliantly crafted."

Her chamber works are performed by musicians such as the Australia Ensemble, The Seymour Group, the Vienna Piano Trio, the New Zealand Trio, the Esperance Trio, Stellar Collective, and Antipoduo in the Netherlands. Her orchestral music has been performed by most of the orchestras in Australia and New Zealand.  Grenfell's music is broadcast regularly on ABC Classic FM in Australia and Concert FM in New Zealand, and is released on Kiwi-Pacific and Trust CDs. Her works are available from the Australian Music Centre, SOUNZ New Zealand Music Centre, Opus House Press and Reed Music.

In 2020 Grenfell composed the score for the ABC documentary Quoll Farm. It was recorded with performers from the Tasmanian Symphony Orchestra.

Awards and career
Grenfell has been a violinist with the Christchurch Symphony Orchestra and the New Zealand Youth Orchestra, and has performed bowed piano with the University of Southern California Percussion Ensemble. Her awards include the Jimmy McHugh Composition Prize and the Halsey Stevens Prize from the University of Southern California, the Composers’ Association of New Zealand Trust Fund Award and the University of Otago's prestigious Philip Neill Memorial Prize.

Winner of the Tasmanian State Award for Ten Suns Ablaze in 2013, and Spirals in 2018 at the Australian Art Music Awards, Grenfell's orchestral music has been commissioned, performed or recorded by all the major symphony orchestras in Australia, and her chamber music is played regularly around the world.

In Spring of 2013 Grenfell was a visiting professor at Stephen F. Austin State University in Nacogdoches, Texas. In the Fall of 2019, Grenfell served as Kerr Composer-in-Residence at the Oberlin Conservatory of Music.

As of 2021 she is an associate professor at the Conservatorium of Music at the University of Tasmania.

In 2022< a new brass fanfare by Grenfell was premiered by the Sydney Symphony Orchestra as part of its 50 Fanfares Project.

Personal life
Grenfell lives in Hobart, Australia, with her husband, guitarist David Malone, and their two children.

References

External links
Maria Grenfell (Personal Website)
Australian Music Centre
Maria Grenfell Page - Tasmanian Composers Collective
Australasian Performing Right Association
IHOS Music Theatre and Opera

Australian women classical composers
21st-century classical composers
Living people
New Zealand emigrants to Australia
Australian opera composers
New Zealand opera composers
People from Hobart
University of Canterbury alumni
University of Southern California alumni
1969 births
New Zealand classical composers
Women opera composers
Academic staff of the University of Tasmania
21st-century women composers